Ro-115 was an Imperial Japanese Navy Ro-100-class submarine. Completed and commissioned in November 1943, she served in World War II, operating in the central Pacific Ocean, the New Guinea campaign, the Indian Ocean, and off the Philippine Islands. She was sunk in February 1945 during her fifth war patrol.

Design and description
The Ro-100 class was a medium-sized, coastal submarine derived from the preceding Kaichū type. They displaced  surfaced and  submerged.

For surface running, the boats were powered by two  diesel engines, each driving one propeller shaft. When submerged each propeller was driven by a  electric motor. They could reach  on the surface and  underwater.

The boats were armed with four internal bow  torpedo tubes and carried a total of eight torpedoes. They were also armed with two single mounts for  Type 96 anti-aircraft guns or a single  L/40 AA gun.

Construction and commissioning

Ro-115 was laid down as Submarine No. 406 on 12 October 1942 by Kawasaki at Kobe, Japan. She had been renamed Ro-115 by the time she was launched on 19 June 1943. She was completed and commissioned on 30 November 1943.

Service history

November 1943–March 1944
Upon commissioning, Ro-115 was attached to the Yokosuka Naval District and was assigned to Submarine Squadron 11 in the 6th Fleet for workups. On 10 March 1944, she was reassigned to Submarine Division 51 in Submarine Squadron 7 in the 6th Fleet. On 11 March 1944 she departed Kure, Japan, bound for Truk, which she reached on 22 March 1944.

First war patrol

On 28 March 1944, Ro-115 departed Truk to begin her first war patrol, assigned a patrol area in the Pacific Ocean west of Jaluit Atoll. The patrol was uneventful, and she returned to Truk on 18 April 1944. She sortied the same day to intercept an Allied task force Japanese forces had reported, but did not find it, and again returned to Truk on 19 April 1944.

Supply mission and second war patrol

Ro-115 departed Truk on 19 May 1944 to carry supplies to Wewak, New Guinea, in support of Japanese forces fighting in the New Guinea campaign. After calling at Wewak on 27 May 1944 and unloading her cargo, she got back underway the same day and proceeded to Palau, where she arrived on 3 June 1944 to deliver secret Imperial Japanese Army documents including codebooks.

On 7 June 1944, Ro-115 put to sea from Palau to begin her second war patrol, with orders to join a submarine patrol line north of New Ireland. On 13 June 1944 the Combined Fleet activated Operation A-Go for the defense of the Mariana Islands, and that day the commander-in-chief of the 6th Fleet, Vice Admiral Takeo Takagi, ordered all available submarines to deploy east of the Marianas. On 14 June 1944, Ro-115 received orders to proceed at flank speed to a new patrol area south of Guam.

The Battle of Saipan began with U.S. landings on Saipan on 15 June 1944. Ro-115 specifically was directed to patrol in the Philippine Sea northwest of Rota in the Marianas. The escorts subjected her to a brief counterattack with depth charges, but she escaped unscathed and received orders to return to Truk, where she arrived on 27 June 1944.

July–October 1944

On 7 July 1944, Ro-115 left Truk and set course for Yokosuka, Japan, arriving there on 17 July 1944. On 10 August 1944, she departed Yokosuka bound for Penang in Japanese-occupied British Malaya, from which she was to conduct operations in the Indian Ocean. During her voyage to Penang, Submarine Division 51 was disbanded on 15 August 1944 and she and Ro-113 were reassigned to Submarine Squadron 8 at Penang.

Third war patrol

Ro-115 began her third war patrol on 25 October 1944, tasked with attacking Allied shipping in the Bay of Bengal. 
Ro-115 found no targets during her patrol and returned to Penang on 8 November 1944.

Fourth war patrol

Ro-115 began her fourth war patrol on 7 December 1944, departing Penang at 17:00 local time, again bound for the Bay of Bengal to patrol in the waters off Madras, India. Her patrol passed quietly, and she returned to Penang on 28 December 1944.

Fifth war patrol

Ro-115 got underway from Penang on 19 January 1945, called at Singapore from 21 to 22 January 1945, and then began her fifth war patrol, setting course for a patrol area in the South China Sea west of Luzon in the Philippine Islands. After her departure from Singapore, the Japanese never heard from her again.

Loss

Bell and the destroyer  closed to investigate, and the target disappeared from radar, indicating a submerging submarine. They soon detected the submarine on sonar and made unsuccessful depth-charge attacks before losing contact. As the destroyer escort  headed for the scene to join the hunt, Bell regained sonar contact on the submarine and made another depth-charge attack, which resulted in an oil slick appearing on the surface.

At 21:22 the destroyer  relieved Bell on the scene.

The submarine Ulvert M. Moore sank probably was Ro-115. On 3 February 1945, the 6th Fleet ordered her to put into port at Takao, Formosa, by no later than 6–8 February, and on 4 February 1945 she and the submarines , Ro-112, and Ro-113 were ordered to unload all of their deck gun ammunition and reserve torpedoes at Takao and then proceed to Batulinao on the north coast of Luzon to rescue Imperial Japanese Navy Air Service pilots stranded in the Aparri area of northern Luzon. Ro-115 never acknowledged any of the orders, and FRUMEL reported on 16 February 1945 that Japanese messages indicated that Ro-115 still had not arrived at Takao to unload her ammunition and torpedoes.

Despite their inability to contact Ro-115, the Japanese reassigned her to Submarine Division 34 on 20 February 1945. On 21 February 1945, however, the Imperial Japanese Navy declared her to be presumed lost off the Philippine Islands with all 59 men on board. The Japanese struck her from the Navy list on 10 May 1945.

An alternative account of Ro-115′s fate holds that she was among the Japanese submarines that the U.S. Navy submarine  sank off Luzon between 10 and 13 February 1945. However, Ro-115 never acknowledged the messages ordering her to conduct her rescue mission at Batulinao and never made port at Takao to unload her ammunition and torpedoes to make room to embark the stranded pilots, and no Japanese messages report her arriving on the coast of Luzon.

Notes

References
 

1943 ships
Ships built by Kawasaki Heavy Industries
World War II submarines of Japan
Japanese submarines lost during World War II
Ro-100-class submarines
Maritime incidents in February 1945
World War II shipwrecks in the South China Sea
Submarines sunk by United States warships
Ships lost with all hands